The USS Harvest Moon was a steam operated gunboat acquired by the Union Navy during the American Civil War. She was used by the Navy to patrol navigable waterways of the Confederacy to prevent the South from trading with other countries.

Background 

Harvest Moon, a side-wheel steamer, was built in 1863 at Portland, Maine, and was purchased by Commodore Montgomery from Charles Spear at Boston, Massachusetts, 16 November 1863. She was fitted out for blockade duty at Boston Navy Yard and commissioned 12 February 1864, Acting Lieutenant J. D. Warren in command.

Civil War Service

Operating with the South Atlantic Blockade 
 
Assigned to the South Atlantic Blockading Squadron, Harvest Moon departed Boston 18 February and arrived off Charleston, South Carolina, 25 February 1864. Next day Rear Admiral John A. Dahlgren made the steamer his flagship. After putting into Washington Navy Yard for repairs. Harvest Moon began her regular blockading duties 7 June 1864 off Charleston.

For the next nine months the steamer served off Tybee Island, Georgia, the North Edisto River, and Charleston harbor. During this period she also acted as a picket and dispatch vessel as well as Admiral Dahlgren's flagship.

Sinking 
 
While proceeding in company with tug  shortly after 0800 on 1 March 1865 Harvest Moon struck a torpedo (mine) in Winyah Bay, South Carolina. Admiral Dahlgren, awaiting breakfast in his cabin, saw the bulkhead shatter and explode toward him. 

The explosion blew a large hole in the ship's hull aft and she sank in 2½ fathoms of water. One man was killed. The admiral and the crew were taken on board . Harvest Moon was stripped of her valuable machinery and abandoned 21 April 1865.

Attempts to raise Harvest Moon 

In 1963, nearly 100 years later, a project was initiated to raise Harvest Moon from the mud at the bottom of Winyah Bay and to restore the ship, but has made little headway.

See also 

 Confederate States Navy

References

External links 
 USS Harvest Moon Historical Society
 USS Harvest Moon (1864-1865).

Ships of the Union Navy
Ships built in Portland, Maine
Steamships of the United States Navy
Gunboats of the United States Navy
American Civil War patrol vessels of the United States
1863 ships
Shipwrecks of the American Civil War
Shipwrecks of the Carolina coast
Ships sunk by mines
Maritime incidents in March 1865